Hortensia Blanch Pita (1 December 1914 – 21 August 2004) was a writer who was born in Cuba and lived in Spain and Mexico. She wrote a noted book about the end of the Spanish Civil War that was published in Mexico. She wrote under the name Silvia Mistral . She had a lifelong interest in film and she died in Mexico.

Life
Blanch was born in Havana on 1 December 1914. Her parents were Catalan and Galician. From 1920 to 1926 the family lived in the area known as Terra Chá in Galicia. After this they returned to Cuba until Spain declared the 2nd Republic and they moved to Barcelona in Catalonia. Blanch's job was in a chemical company but her passion was film. She ended up working for Paramount Pictures and Metro Pictures in Spain. Here she befriended the photographer Kati Horna.

Blanch was writing at the age of 18 for the newspapers Las Noticias and El Día Gráfico. During the Spanish Civil War she continued to write. As the nationalist forces took Catalonia she returned to her place of work at a film distribution company to see Barcelona looking as if it was in flames. The city was not under fire but her company was burning republican films and others were burning employee records, incriminating books and political party membership cards. Several days later they saw locals also burning republican and Catalan flags.

Blanch left Europe for Mexico. Her partner was the anarchist Ricardo Mestre. Her description of being a refugee at the end of the Spanish Civil War was published by the Mexican "Hoy" newspaper and it was later published as the book Éxodo. Diario de una refugiada española in 1940. In Mexico she continued to review films and she also wrote several more books.

Blanch died in Mexico City on 21 August 2004.

Works
Éxodo, diario de una refugiada española. 1940
Violetas imperiales
Madréporas. Ed. Minerva. 1944
La cola de la sirena (Stories from Mexico for young readers). Ed. Trillas. 24 pp. . 1983
Mingo, el niño de la banda. Ed. Trillas. 32 pp. ilustró Bruno López. . 1985
La Cenicienta china. Ed. Trillas. 32 pp. il. . 1986
La bruja vestida de rosa. Ed. Trillas. 32 pp. . 1988

References

1914 births
2004 deaths
Writers from Havana
20th-century Mexican writers
20th-century Mexican women writers
Cuban expatriates in Spain
Cuban emigrants to Mexico